Sirumadurai which is located at Thiruvennainallur block, Thiruvennai nallur taluk, Villupuram district, Tamil Nadu, India.
State Assembly Constituency :Tirukkoyilur (State Assembly Constituency)

References

Villages in Kallakurichi district